Mousteroid was a culture occurring during the period 80,000 - 50,000 BP of Central, Southern and East Africa. Examples of this culture are the tool-industry of the Middle Paleolithic in West Africa, known from sites at Zenebi, Nigeria and Tiemassas in Senegal.

Dakar and Rufisque
The most important of the Western Senegal sites is Pte. de Fann in Dakar. Classified Mousteroid, indicating similarities to industry Mousterian in form but neither akin to, nor at a temporal parallel. Other sites about Dakar and Rufisque, were part of a culture that had not occurred for sufficient duration for  tools to be found at differing depths in the ground (without stratification).

References 

Middle Stone Age cultures
Archaeology of Central Africa
Archaeology of Western Africa
Archaeology of Southern Africa
Archaeology of Eastern Africa